Den Helder is a municipality and a city in the Netherlands, in the province of North Holland.  Den Helder occupies the northernmost point of the North Holland peninsula.  It is home to the country's main naval base.
From here the Royal TESO ferryboat service operates the transportation link between Den Helder and the nearby Dutch Wadden island of Texel to the north.

Etymology 
Before the year 1928 the official name of Den Helder was Helder. The origin of the name Helder is not entirely clear. The name Helder may have come from Helle/Helde, which means "hill" or "hilly grounds", or from Helre, which means a sandy ridge. Another explanation is that the name derived from Helsdeur (Hell's Door), likely because in the water between Den Helder and Texel (called Marsdiep) the current was so strong that many ships were lost.

History 

Huisduinen was the original older part of the city, whereas Helder itself was a nearby smaller hamlet. When a harbour was built near Helder the village began to grow and later became the seat of governance instead of Huisduinen. Due to its strategic location at the tip of the North Holland peninsula, multiple fortifications were built in the area.

Den Helder has played an important part in Dutch shipping. During the Dutch Golden Age, ships would be assembled near Den Helder and sail the world's oceans from there.

On 23January 1795, the French captured 14 Dutch ships and 850 guns in the town's deep-frozen harbour. In 1799 the city was the target of the Anglo-Russian invasion of Holland.

During the 1820s, the North Holland Canal was dug from Amsterdam to Den Helder. In the Second World War most of the city was evacuated and the old city center was destroyed.

Geography

Climate 
Den Helder is on the tip of a lowland peninsula jutting out into the North Sea Because of this, Den Helder's climate is heavily moderated by the maritime environment. Also, Den Helder is one of the sunniest cities in the Netherlands.

Population centres 
The municipality of Den Helder consists of the following cities, towns, villages and/or districts: Den Helder, Huisduinen, Julianadorp, and the hamlets Friese Buurt and De Kooy.

The major areas of Den Helder are the Stad binnen de Linie (city within the city's defence line), Nieuw-Den Helder, and De Schooten. Nieuw-Den Helder was built in the 1950s, following World War II, when there was a great need for additional housing. De Schooten was constructed in the 1960s.

Topography 

Dutch Topographic map of Den Helder (town), March 2014.

Naval base 

Den Helder was the site of a naval base as early as the 18th century. An Anglo-Russian invasion force landed at Den Helder in August 1799 and captured the Batavian navy there (see Battle of Castricum). French emperor Napoleon Bonaparte, visiting Den Helder in 1811, was impressed with the town's strategic location and ordered the construction of a fort (Kijkduin) and naval dockyards (Willemsoord). The docks were built during the years 1813–1827. In 1947, it officially became the Royal Netherlands Navy's main centre of operations. Den Helder continues to be the navy's main base today. The Royal Netherlands Naval College is also located in the city, as is the Dutch Navy Museum.

The old naval dockyards of Willemsoord, located in the north of the city, now house restaurants, a cinema, and other recreational facilities. The naval docks and administration have been moved to a new location further east.

Transport 

The town is served by two railway stations:

Den Helder
Den Helder Zuid (South Den Helder)

Den Helder can be reached by these main roads:
N9
N99
N250
N502

These roads all have only two lanes. There is no highway leading to Den Helder.

Local government 
The municipal council of Den Helder consists of 31 seats, which are divided as follows as of the 2022 elections:

 Behoorlijk Bestuur – 7 seats
 Beter voor Den Helder – 4 seats
 VVD – 3 seats
 CDA – 3 seats
 D66 – 2 seats
 GroenLinks – 2 seats
 PVV – 2 seats
 Stadspartij Den Helder – 2 seats
 Seniorenpartij – 2 seats
 PvdA – 2 seats
 ChristenUnie – 1 seat
 Samen Actief Sr – 1 seat

Notable people

Public thinking & Public Service 
 Frans van Anraat (born 1942), businessman, sold raw materials to produce chemical weapons to Saddam Hussein
 Marleen Barth (born 1964), politician, trade union leader and journalist
 Petrus Johannes Blok (1855–1929) a Dutch historian
 Edward W. Bok (1863-1930), Dutch-American editor, Pulitzer Prize winner
 Esther Welmoet Wijnaendts Francken-Dyserinck (1876-1956) a journalist, feminist and cofounder of Dutch Girl Guiding
 Cornelis Giles (1675-1722), a navigator and cartographer
 Rijkman Groenink (born 1949), banker, CEO of ABN-Amro
 Gerard 't Hooft (born 1946), physicist and academic, shared the 1999 Nobel Prize in Physics
 William Lonsdale (1799-1864), soldier, colonialist, helped found Melbourne, Australia
 Theo de Meester (1851–1919) politician, Prime Minister of the Netherlands 1905 to 1908 
 Ed Nijpels (born 1950), former minister of Housing (1986–1989) and former mayor of Breda
 Dorus Rijkers (1847-1928), lifeboat captain and folk hero
 Paul Rosenmöller (born 1956), a TV presenter and former politician and trade unionist
 René Schoof (born 1955), mathematician and academic in Rome
 Aletta Stas-Bax (born 1965) an entrepreneur in Swiss watches and an author

The Arts 

 IJf Blokker (born 1930) a Dutch musician, TV actor and presenter
 Gré Brouwenstijn (1915-1999), opera singer
 Benjamin Feliksdal (born 1940) a Dutch ballet dancer
 Dick Ket (1902–1940) a Dutch magic realist painter of still lifes and self-portraits 
 Hanco Kolk (born 1957) a Dutch cartoonist and comics artist
 Anton Pieck (1895-1987), painter and graphic artist
 Milly Scott (born 1933) a Dutch singer and actress of Surinamese origin
 Quintino (born 1985) a Dutch DJ

Sport 

 Jorina Baars (born 1988) a Dutch female kickboxing Thai fighter
 Edith Bosch (born 1980), Judo world champion and Olympic silver and bronze medalist
 Anthonij Guépin (1897–1964) a sailor and bronze medallist at the 1924 Summer Olympics 
 Erwin Koen (born 1978) a Dutch former footballer with over 300 club caps
 Elien Meijer (born 1970) a retired rower, team silver medallist at the 2000 Summer Olympics 
 Swen Nater (born 1950), basketball player
 Martine Ohr (born 1964), field hockey striker, gold medallist at the 1984 Summer Olympics
 Chima Onyeike (born 1975), Dutch football coach and former professional player, fitness coach for VfB Stuttgart
 Hans Smits (born 1956), water polo player, bronze medallist at the 1976 Summer Olympics
 Mark de Vries (born 1975), Dutch footballer with 370 club caps, plays for ONS Boso Sneek.
 Sieme Zijm (born 1978) a former Dutch footballer with over 300 club caps

In popular culture 
The Frank Boeijen Groep song Haast (rust roest) contains the line " 's avonds in Den Helder". (English- In the evening in Den Helder)
The Rob de Nijs song Jan Klaassen de Trompetter contains the line "hij marcheerde van Den Helder tot Den Briel". (English- He marched from Den Helder to Den Briel).

References

External links

Official website

 
Cities in the Netherlands
Municipalities of North Holland
Populated coastal places in the Netherlands
Populated places in North Holland
Port cities and towns of the North Sea